William Head may refer to:

 William O. Head (1859–1931), mayor of Louisville, Kentucky, 1909–1913
 William K. Head (born 1947), head football coach for the Kentucky State University Thorobreds